Midnight's Furies: The Deadly Legacy of India's Partition is a non-fiction book by Nisid Hajari, published in 2015 by Houghton Mifflin Harcourt. The book chronicles the partition of India and the riots and other violence that followed. It was the 2016 recipient of the Colby Award.

References

2015 non-fiction books
Books about India
Books about Pakistan
Houghton Mifflin books